Fads is plural for fad, a practice or interest followed for a time with exaggerated zeal.

Fads or FADS may also refer to:

 FMN adenylyltransferase
 FADS (candy), an Australian candy cigarette
 The FADS gene locus, containing the genes FADS1 and FADS2, which respectively encode the enzymes FADS1 and FADS2

See also
 Fad (disambiguation)